The Toroidal Fusion Core Experiment (TFCX) was a US design study for a tokamak fusion experiment in the mid 1980s.

It was intended to achieve ignition using long burns of over 100 seconds. It could have used superconducting coils to create a 10 Tesla magnetic field.
Designed for an nt ~ 3x1020 and ion energy ~ 10-20keV, it was never built.

References

Tokamaks